William York Macgregor (14 October 1855 Finnart House, Loch Long, Dunbartonshire – 28 September 1923 Oban) was a Scottish landscape painter, and leading figure of the Glasgow Boys.

Life
He was the son of the very wealthy Glasgow shipbuilder John Macgregor by his second wife, Margaret York.

Macgregor studied in Glasgow under Robert Greenlees and James Docharty and at the Slade School under Alphonse Legros.

He joined former schoolfriend James Paterson (1854–1932) in 1878 and they co-founded the "Glasgow School" meeting at his studio 134 Bath Street in central Glasgow.

He exhibited at the Royal Scottish Academy from 1875 (Associate R.S.A. 1898; R.S.A. 1921) and twice at the Royal Academy, was a member of the R.S.W.S. 1885–1906 and the New English Art Club in 1892. Macgregor  travelled widely on the Continent 1886–90. A member of Glasgow Art Club, work by Macgregor was included in the club's Memorial Exhibition in April 1935, in memory of those of its members who had died since the First World War.

He lived his final years at Albyn Lodge in Bridge of Allan.

He died in Oban on 28 September 1923. He is buried in Old Logie Kirkyard east of Bridge of Allan. The graveyard lies a few hundred metres north of the modern Logie Cemetery. The grave is against the north wall.

Family

He was married to Jessie Watson (died 1941).

References

External links

W Y MacGrogor
W Y MacGregor (Gazetteer for Scotland).
W Y Macgregor (Tate Gallery)

1855 births
1923 deaths
19th-century Scottish painters
Scottish male painters
20th-century Scottish painters
Landscape artists
19th-century Scottish male artists
20th-century Scottish male artists